Ronald 'Mack' Hellings (September 14, 1915 – November 11, 1951) was an American racecar driver from Fort Dodge, Iowa. He died in a plane crash in Kern County, California in 1951.

Indy 500 results

World Championship career summary
The Indianapolis 500 was part of the FIA World Championship from 1950 through 1960. Drivers competing at Indy during those years were credited with World Championship points and participation. Mack Hellings participated in 2 World Championship races, with a best finish of thirteenth.

References

1915 births
1951 deaths
Indianapolis 500 drivers
American racing drivers
Sportspeople from Fort Dodge, Iowa
Racing drivers from Iowa
Accidental deaths in California
Victims of aviation accidents or incidents in 1951
Victims of aviation accidents or incidents in the United States